Evan Hardy Collegiate Institute is located on the East side of Saskatoon, Saskatchewan, Canada, serving students from grades 9 through 12. It is also known as Evan Hardy, Hardy, or simply EHCI.

Evan Hardy Collegiate was named for noted University of Saskatchewan professor Evan Alan Hardy. The school was opened in 1966.

Evan Hardy centres the first Saskatoon Media School, an entire semester of media-based classes for students all around Saskatoon and area. It was one of only three Saskatoon high schools to offer the SAGE program (the others are Bedford Road and Walter Murray) for gifted students until 2021.

Its feeder schools are Brunskill School, Colette Bourgonje School, College Park School, Greystone Heights School, Lakeridge School, Lakeview School, Roland Michener School, and Wildwood School.

Extracurricular activities

Sports

Arts

Student council
The Evan Hardy SRC (student representative council) consists of several representatives of each grade, a team of directors, and three volunteer teacher advisors.  The elections for Grade 10-12 leaders takes place at the end of the year.  Two Grade 9 representatives are elected during November earlier in the year, and three more are later appointed through an interview process.

Notable alumni
Mike Anderson, former CFL player
Jaime Battiste, Member of Parliament for Sydney—Victoria
Ewan Currie, musician
Martine Gaillard, TV Personality
Ryan Gullen, musician
Garnet Hertz, artist, designer and Canada Research Chair
Susan Ormiston, television broadcaster
Jeff Piercy, former CFL Fullback
Doug Redl, former CFL player
Scott Redl, former CFL player
Wade Regier, former head coach of the Minot State Beavers men's ice hockey team
Kyle Riabko, musician/actor
Jay Semko, musician
Brian Skrudland, former NHL forward
Chandler Stephenson, current NHL player for the Vegas Golden Knights
Larry Wruck, former CFL player
Trent Yawney, former Chicago Blackhawks head coach (2005–06)

External links

Evan Hardy Collegiate
Saskatoon Public Schools

References

High schools in Saskatoon
Educational institutions established in 1966
1966 establishments in Saskatchewan